A. Magazine was an East Asian American-focused magazine published by A.Media, Inc., headquartered in Midtown Manhattan and with offices in Los Angeles and San Francisco. Geared towards a young audience, its mission was to "report on the developments, address the issues, and celebrate the achievements of this [Asian] dynamic new population."

It was founded in 1989 by Jeff Yang, Amy Chu, Sandi Kim and Bill Yao to cover East Asian American issues and culture, and often featured fashion spreads, advice columns, horoscopes, and news stories. It grew out of a campus magazine Yang edited while an undergraduate at Harvard University. Though well-known and influential in the East Asian American community, it was almost never profitable in its thirteen-year existence.

The magazine operated for twelve years. In its tenth year, the magazine made a profit for the first time. During that year it reached its circulation high of 200,000. When the economy declined in 2001, the magazine declined. Until it ceased on February 20, 2002, it was the largest publication for Anglophonic East Asian Americans in the United States, with bimonthly readership exceeding 200,000 in North America.

In November 1999, it obtained 4.5 million dollars in venture capital funding, and the company was renamed aMedia, reflecting a branching out into Web publishing. Unfortunately, this change came right as the dot-com boom was turning to bust. In early 2000, right after announcing their move to a  office in San Francisco, the stock market nose-dove.  In a desperate attempt to recover, they merged with Click2Asia in November 2000. After a tough shareholder fight, the merged company was shut down in 2002.

See also

 Yolk magazine

References

External links
A. Magazine (Archive)

Asian-American culture in New York City
Asian-American magazines
Defunct magazines published in the United States
Magazines established in 1989
Magazines disestablished in 2002
Magazines published in New York City
News magazines published in the United States